Wojciech Borzuchowski (born 10 November 1961 in Wysokie Mazowieckie) is a Polish politician, a member of Law and Justice party until 2007, when he joined  the Polish People's Party. He was elected to Sejm on 25 September 2001 and served until 2005.

References

1961 births
Living people
People from Wysokie Mazowieckie
Law and Justice politicians
Polish People's Party politicians
Bialystok University of Technology alumni